Polar aviation refers to aviation in the polar regions of the Earth. Specifically, one may speak of Arctic aviation and Antarctic aviation in the Arctic and Antarctic respectively.

The major factors which define the character of polar aviation include remoteness from major populated areas, specific physical geography and climate. Specific factors include low temperatures, frequent changes of meteorological conditions, polar night, the uncertainty of magnetic compasses, difficulties in radio communication, and lack of landmarks.

Early history
The dream of air travel to the Pole has a lengthy prehistory.  As early as the 1870s, John Powles Cheyne, a veteran of three British Arctic expeditions, was proposing a voyage to the pole via balloon. Nevertheless, in terms of actual flight, S. A. Andrée's Arctic balloon expedition of 1897 is commonly considered to mark the beginning of polar aviation. Later, Zeppelins were used for exploitation of the Arctic, and eventually airplanes. In 1914, a Russian plane (Farman MF.11, pilot Jan Nagórski, mechanic Yevgeni Kuznetsov)  flew beyond the Arctic Circle in the area of Novaya Zemlya in search of the North Pole expedition of Georgiy Sedov. The beginning of the century witnessed the aviation quest for the North Pole. By the mid-1920s polar aviation had become feasible.

Antarctic aviation

Early history
Fokker Super Universal Virginia piloted by Richard Evelyn Byrd was the first aircraft to land on the mainland of Antarctica  during Byrd's first Antarctic expedition, 1928-1930, when he was first to fly over the South Pole on November 29, 1929.

References

Further reading
Prospects of polar aviation in tourism are discussed in the book "Prospects for Polar Tourism" by John Snyder, Bernard Stonehouse, 2007, p. 26

See also
List of Russian aviators (includes polar aviators as well)

External links
 Jon Allen Manuscript on Arctic Aviation at Dartmouth College Library

Aviation in the Arctic
Exploration of the Arctic